City of London Academy, Southwark is a co-educational secondary school and sixth form with academy status, located in the Bermondsey area of the London Borough of Southwark, England.

The school was first opened in 2003, and moved to a new building in 2005. The building was designed by Studio E Architects and built by Willmott Dixon. The school is sponsored by the City of London Corporation, along with City Academy, Hackney and City of London Academy Islington.

The school has specialisms in Business and Enterprise and in Sport, and the school teaches the non-curricular subject Business Studies, designed to help pupils become entrepreneurs.

A unique aspect of The City of London Academy, Southwark is that students pay for their lunches with a Prepaid MasterCard debit card that parents top up using a smartphone app. Students can also pay for their meals with a fingerprint scanner.

Catchment area

All pupils living in the City of London or Southwark are eligible to attend the school. Some students can board the city bus to the school if they live outside the area.

School uniform

The school requires a school uniform. Uniforms include purple blazers, grey jumpers, white shirts and grey trousers. The tie worn is coloured black, blue, purple, grey and red with diagonal stripes. The prefects are entitled to wear plain purple ties with the academy logos.

Standards

A short 2016 Ofsted inspection rated the school as "Good".

References

External links
City of London Academy, Southwark official website

Secondary schools in the London Borough of Southwark
Academies in the London Borough of Southwark
Educational institutions established in 2003
2003 establishments in England